Eucereon imriei is a moth of the subfamily Arctiinae. It was described by Herbert Druce in 1884. It is found on Guadeloupe, Dominica, Montserrat and Saint Kitts.

References

 

imriei
Moths described in 1884